was a village located in Tone District, northeastern Gunma Prefecture, Japan.

Geography 
River：Katashina River, 室淵川

History 
April 1, 1889 Due to the municipal status enforcement, the villages of Itoi(糸井) and Kainose(貝之瀬) merged to form the village of Itonose, Kitaseta District.
April 1, 1896 Due to the district mergers(merger between Kitaseta and Tone Districts), the village belongs to Tone District.
November 1, 1958 Merged with the village of Kuroho, Tone District, to become the village of Showa, Tone District.

Itonose